The 5th constituency of Val-d'Oise is a French legislative constituency in the Val-d'Oise département.
It is currently represented by Fiona Lazaar of La République En Marche! (LREM).

Description

The 5th constituency of Val-d'Oise covers the large suburban town of Argenteuil in the south of the department. The town which sits on the north bank of the Seine opposite Colombes and close to Nanterre both of which form large parts of Paris's north western suburbs.

Politically the seat is marginal and control of it has swung between left and right in line with the national trend. The seat is notable for once being held by former French Communist Party leader Robert Hue.

Historic Representation

Election results

2022

 
 
 
 
 
 
 
 
|-
| colspan="8" bgcolor="#E9E9E9"|
|-

2017

2012

 
 
 
 
 
|-
| colspan="8" bgcolor="#E9E9E9"|
|-

2007

 
 
 
 
 
 
 
|-
| colspan="8" bgcolor="#E9E9E9"|
|-

2002

 
 
 
 
 
|-
| colspan="8" bgcolor="#E9E9E9"|
|-

1997

 
 
 
 
 
 
 
 
|-
| colspan="8" bgcolor="#E9E9E9"|
|-

Sources
Official results of French elections from 2002: "Résultats électoraux officiels en France" (in French).

5